The 2022–23 Croatian First Futsal League (also known as Prva hrvatska malonogometna liga or Prva HMNL) is the 32nd season of the Croatian First Futsal League, the national championship for men's futsal teams in Croatia, since its establishment in 1992. The season started on 30 September 2022 with first round and will end in May 2022 with finals.

Competition system 
The competition takes place in two parts.

First part: Double round robin league with ten clubs playing total of 18 rounds. After end of first part top eight teams goes to playoffs while the last one is relegated and ninth goes to promotion/relegation playoff with the winner of three groups of the Second Croatian futsal league.

Second part: Playoffs in which eight best placed clubs play after the first part of the competition. The quarter-finals and semi-finals are played on two won matches, and the finals on three won matches. During the playoffs in the quarter-finals, semi-finals and finals, the better placed club from the first part of the championship retains the right to host in the first, third and eventual fifth game. Playoff match pairs are determined according to the following schedule:

Quarter-finals: 1st against 8th, 2nd against 7th, 3rd against 6th and 4th against 5th;

Semi-finals: winner of quarterfinal match 1 against  winner of quarterfinal match 4 and winner of quarterfinal match 2 against winner of quarterfinal of match 3; 

Finale: winner of semifinal match 1 against winner of semifinal match 2.

Teams

Changes 
Osijek and Torcida were promoted to the Prva HMNL after finishing on top two places in qualifications. Alumnus Sesvete was relegated finishing last in the Prva HMNL, while Šibenik 1983 was eliminated in qualification.

Club locations

League table

Results 
Each team plays home-and-away against every other team in the league, for a total of 18 matches each played.

Playoff

Quarter-finals

Semi-finals

Final

Statistics

Top goalscorers

References 

2022 in futsal
Futsal competitions in Croatia